Margaret Frances Carnegie  (14 March 1910 – 5 August 2002) was an Australian writer, art patron and collector.

Biography 
Margaret Frances Carnegie was born in Melbourne on 14 March 1910, daughter of Henry George Allen and Amelia Burberry. She was educated at Lauriston Girls' School and then a finishing school in Switzerland. She married Douglas Howard Carnegie on 11 March 1931 at Scots' Church, Melbourne.

Desmond Digby's portrait of Carnegie was a finalist for the 1966 Archibald Prize. It was acquired by the Art Gallery of New South Wales in 1991. 

The 1976 film, Mad Dog Morgan, was based on her book, Morgan: The Bold Bushranger. 

Carnegie was awarded the Medal of the Order of Australia in the 1985 Australia Day Honours. She was promoted to Officer of the Order of Australia in the 1990 Queen's Birthday Honours for "service to art, literature and to local history".

Carnegie was awarded an honorary doctor of letters by Charles Sturt University in Wagga Wagga, New South Wales. The university holds the Margaret Carnegie Collection of Australiana within its archives.

Carnegie died on 5 August 2002. She was predeceased by her husband in 1998. Her son, Roderick Carnegie, and three daughters survived her.

Selected works

Books

Libretto

References

External links 

 Margaret Carnegie, collector and patron

1910 births
2002 deaths
20th-century Australian women writers
20th-century Australian writers
Officers of the Order of Australia
People educated at Lauriston Girls' School